Denver's many colleges and universities range in age and study programs. The city has Roman Catholic and Jewish institutions, as well as two medical schools in its suburbs. In addition to those schools within the city, there are a number of schools located throughout the surrounding metro area.

Public

Auraria Campus  
Community College of Denver
Metropolitan State University of Denver
University of Colorado Denver

Private

Non-profit 
Regis University
University of Denver

For-profit 
The Art Institute of Colorado
Colorado Technical University
Lincoln College of Technology (formerly known as Denver Automotive and Diesel College)
National American University
Rocky Mountain College of Art and Design
Rocky Vista University College of Osteopathic Medicine

Seminaries 
Denver Seminary
Iliff School of Theology
Saint John Vianney Theological Seminary
Yeshiva Toras Chaim Talmudical Seminary

References

Education in Denver